Woodbridge Windmill may refer to a number of windmills.

There were eight windmills in Woodbridge, Suffolk. Three of which survive, although not all are on their original sites.

Buttrum's Mill, Burkitt Road.
Tricker's Mill, Theatre Street.
A post mill on Mill Hill was moved to Ramsey, Essex in 1842 and still stands there.